The MRWA C class was a class of steam locomotives built by Kitson & Co. in Leeds, England, for the Midland Railway of Western Australia (MRWA).  The class's wheel arrangement was 4-6-2.  The five members of the class entered service in 1912 and worked on the MRWA until the 1950s.

See also 
 List of Western Australian locomotive classes
 Locomotives of the Western Australian Government Railways

Notes

Further reading

External links

C class
4-6-2 locomotives
Railway locomotives introduced in 1912
Kitson locomotives
3 ft 6 in gauge locomotives of Australia
Scrapped locomotives
Passenger locomotives